Janis Lynn Sammartino (born April 24, 1950) is a United States district judge of the United States District Court for the Southern District of California.

Early life and education
Born in Philadelphia, Pennsylvania, Sammartino graduated from Occidental College with her Artium Baccalaureus degree in 1972 and later from Notre Dame Law School with a Juris Doctor in 1975.

Legal career
Following law school graduation, Sammartino worked as a law clerk for St. Joseph County Superior Court Judge Douglas Seely from 1975 to 1976. She was a deputy city attorney of San Diego City Attorney's Office, California from 1976 to 1994. Sammartino was a judge on the  San Diego Municipal Court from 1994 to 1995. She was a judge on the San Diego County Superior Court from 1995 to 2007.

Judicial career
Sammartino was nominated to the United States District Court for the Southern District of California by President George W. Bush on March 19, 2007 to a seat vacated by the death of Judith Keep. Sammartino was confirmed by the Senate on September 10, 2007 on a Senate vote and received commission on September 21, 2007.

On May 17, 2017, U.S. District Judge Sammartino sentenced Rear Admiral Robert Gilbeau, the first active duty admiral ever convicted of a felony, to 18 months in prison for his involvement in the Fat Leonard scandal, although Gilbeau will still be allowed to continue collecting his nearly $10,000 monthly pension.

References

Sources

1950 births
California state court judges
Living people
Occidental College alumni
Notre Dame Law School alumni
Judges of the United States District Court for the Southern District of California
United States district court judges appointed by George W. Bush
21st-century American judges
Superior court judges in the United States
Lawyers from Philadelphia
21st-century American women judges